Priyaragalu is 1997 Telugu-language romantic musical film, produced by Sunkara Madhu Murali under the Melody Theaters banner and directed by A. Kodandarami Reddy. It stars Jagapati Babu, Soundarya, Maheswari, Master Anand Vardhan and has music composed by M. M. Keeravani. The film is a remake of Malayalam film, Pappayude Swantham Appoos and won two Nandi Awards.

Plot 
The film begins with Madhu is a topmost model who resorted to his work after being unable to cope with his wife Priya's death. During the process, he unintentionally neglects his only son, Kush Lav, and is unable to fulfill anything for him. Meanwhile, Kush Lav becomes friends with a girl Sneha that falls for Madhu, but he shows annoyance towards her. Sneha's half-brother Banerjee, who had a land dispute with Madhu realizes that his sister is staying with him, so he forcefully takes her back. Kush Lav becomes disappointed and turns rebellious, which culminates in Madhu's hitting. Afterward, he realizes his mistake, apologizes to Kush Lav, and promises to bring back Sneha. At her residence, Banerjee mistreats Madhu which leads to a fight where Kush Lav gets caught up. As time passes, Madhu notices an illness in Kush Lav and he finds out it is a serious internal hemorrhage and urgent surgery is required. Now is the less time left for Madhu to spend with his son and he wants to fulfill all the promises given to him before the operation. So he decides to get Sneha, who is to be married against her wishes. Madhu rescues Sneha from Banerjee and the three of them travel towards a temple, where Kush Lav witnesses his mother Priya's soul under the illusion of leading to his survival. Finally, the movie ends with the marriage of Madhu and Sneha.

Cast

Soundtrack 
The music was composed by M. M. Keeravani. The music was released on T-Series Music Company.

Reception 
A critic from Andhra Today opined that "On the whole a good movie, which could have avoided being marred by the plagiarism of comic scenes from a recent popular movie".

Awards 
Nandi Awards – 1997
 Best Child Actor – Master Ananda Vardhan
 Best Male Playback Singer – S. P. Balasubrahmanyam – "Chinna"

References

External links 

1990s musical comedy-drama films
1990s romantic comedy-drama films
1990s romantic musical films
1990s Telugu-language films
1997 comedy-drama films
1997 films
Films based on Indian novels
Films based on romance novels
Films directed by A. Kodandarami Reddy
Films scored by M. M. Keeravani
Films set in Hyderabad, India
Films shot in Hyderabad, India
Indian musical comedy-drama films
Indian romantic comedy-drama films
Indian romantic musical films